Ayuu-Tapan is a village in Osh Region of Kyrgyzstan. It is part of the Alay District. Its population was 1,337 in 2021.

References

Populated places in Osh Region